Patrick Shannon may refer to:

 Patrick Shannon (mayor) (1824–1871), mayor of Kansas City, Missouri, 1864–1865
 Patrick Shannon (skeleton racer) (born 1977), Irish skeleton racer

See also
Pat Shannon (disambiguation)